Charle Cournoyer (born June 11, 1991) is a Canadian short track speed skater. He won an Olympic bronze medal in the 500 m at the 2014 Winter Olympics. Cournoyer was also part of the gold medal World Championship relay team at the 2013 ISU World Championships for Canada.

Career
Cournoyer won a surprise bronze medal in the 500 m at the 2014 Winter Olympics. After winning the medal he said that "I came in here to have as much fun as possible. I was expecting to be good but the bronze medal? It was a fog for me. I was just racing, doing what I know. The atmosphere was really great, with Victor An winning the gold medal. It was super loud." He was the youngest member of the Canadian short track team at the 2014 Winter Olympics. Cournoyer had been pegged by national director, Yves Hamelin, as a rising star in Canadian short track. Hamelin said that "He's the one we invested a lot in the last couple of years." His son Charles Hamelin, an Olympic star for Canada also spoke highly of Cournoyer, saying that "He's the future of short track for Canada. It's good for him to bring back a medal. It will put some confidence in his skating."

2018 Winter Olympics
In August 2017, Cournoyer was named to Canada's 2018 Winter Olympics team.

References

External links
Speed Skating Canada profile

1991 births
Living people
Canadian male short track speed skaters
Olympic short track speed skaters of Canada
Olympic bronze medalists for Canada
Olympic medalists in short track speed skating
Short track speed skaters at the 2014 Winter Olympics
Short track speed skaters at the 2018 Winter Olympics
Medalists at the 2014 Winter Olympics
Medalists at the 2018 Winter Olympics
People from Boucherville
Sportspeople from Quebec
World Short Track Speed Skating Championships medalists
21st-century Canadian people